Sheng Guangzu (born 5 April 1949) was the last Chinese Minister of Railways before the position was abolished in March 2013, and the first Genenal Manager of China Railway Corporation. He was formerly the head of the General Administration of Customs of the People's Republic of China. He initially held several lower positions in the Ministry of Railways, and moved up the ranks starting in 2000. Sheng was also a member of the 17th Central Committee of the Chinese Communist Party.

Early life and education
Born in April 1949 in Nanjing, Jiangsu, he is a member of the China's majority Han ethnic group and holds a bachelor's degree.

Career
While deputy governor of the Ministry of China Railway Communication, he supported the creation of China Netcom to compete with China Telecom.  He became a board member of China Netcom and the Ministry of Railways was given a quarter interest in the company.

Sheng replaced his predecessor Liu Zhijun who was dismissed for corruption. During his tenure, the Wenzhou train collision occurred on July 23, 2011, killing 40, and injuring 192 (12 severely).

Sheng retired in October 2016. He was replaced by Lu Dongfu, as the first director of the National Railways Administration (NRA). In November 2016, he was appointed as Vice-Chairperson of the National People's Congress Financial and Economic Affairs Committee.

Downfall
On 25 March 2022, he was placed under investigation for "serious violations of discipline and laws" by the Central Commission for Discipline Inspection (CCDI), the party's internal disciplinary body, and the National Supervisory Commission, the highest anti-corruption agency of China. On September 19, he was expelled from the Chinese Communist Party. He was arrested by the Supreme People's Procuratorate on October 8.

References

1949 births
Living people
Tongji University alumni
Politicians from Nanjing
People's Republic of China politicians from Jiangsu
Chinese Communist Party politicians from Jiangsu
Chinese people in rail transport
Government ministers of the People's Republic of China
Expelled members of the Chinese Communist Party